Achilles was launched in 1813 at Shields. She sailed from Shields to London and then operated for some years as a transport. She later traded more generally. In 1820 new owners moved her to Dundee. She became a whaler in the British northern whale fishery until she was lost there in 1830.

Career
Achilles first appeared in the Register of Shipping (RS), and in Lloyd's Register (LR) in 1813.

The data below is from the Scottish Arctic Whaling Database. All the voyages were to Davis Strait.

Although the information in Lloyd's Register remained unchanged for some more years, in 1820 new owners, Newell & Co., shifted Achilless registry to Dundee and started sailing her as a whaler.

Fate
Achilles, Valentine, master, was lost in 1830 in the Davis Strait.

Eighteen-thirty was the worst year for ship losses since 1819, when whalers first crossed the straits. Eighteen whalers were lost, for a total tonnage of 5,614 tons (bm). The second highest loss occurred in 1823 when 13 vessels totaling 4,409 tons (bm), were lost.

Notes

Citations and references
Citations

References

1813 ships
Ships built on the River Tyne
Age of Sail merchant ships of England
Whaling ships
Maritime incidents in 1830